Liu Lei (born 16 November 1987 in Zaozhuang) is a Chinese Paralympic powerlifter. He won four consecutive gold medals at the Summer Paralympics. He also won two gold medals and one silver at the World Para Powerlifting Championships.

At the 2020 Summer Paralympics, he won a gold medal in the men's 65 kg event.

References

External links
 
 

1987 births
Living people
Chinese powerlifters
Paralympic powerlifters of China
Paralympic gold medalists for China
Paralympic medalists in powerlifting
Powerlifters at the 2020 Summer Paralympics
Medalists at the 2020 Summer Paralympics
People from Zaozhuang
Sportspeople from Shandong
21st-century Chinese people